Hystrichomorpha is a genus of moths in the Carposinidae family. It contains the single species Hystrichomorpha acanthina, which is found in New Guinea.

References

Natural History Museum Lepidoptera generic names catalog

Carposinidae
Monotypic moth genera